Frvrfriday (stylized in all caps) is the stage name of Tommy Ruhingubugi, an Rwandan-Canadian R&B singer, rapper and record producer. He is best known for his 2020 single "Window Shopping" which featured American rapper Lil Baby and "What I Like" featuring Anders which earned him a nomination for Rap Single of the Year at the Juno Awards of 2022.

Early life 
Originally from Rwanda, Tommy was born in London. When he was aged two, he moved to Montreal, Canada with his mum where he grew up. He made his first beat with his family computer at the age of 14.

Career 
Tommy released his debut single "Got It" in 2017. The same year, he released 2 EPs, "More Than You Know" and "Offline". After releasing couple singles, the following year his 3rd 6 tracked Extended play, "WHOISFRIDAY", was released. Since then he has released multiple singles including "Nana" which was later sampled in Pop Smoke, Dababy and Lil Baby "For The Night".

Critical reception 
In April 2020, Complex called "Nana" a laid-back banger and was listed as number 4 in 10 best Canadian songs of the month.

References

External links 

 FRVRFRIDAY at AllMusic

Living people
Canadian rhythm and blues singers
Canadian record producers
Canadian people of Rwandan descent
Year of birth missing (living people)